The Community Research and Development Information Service (CORDIS) is the European Commission's primary public repository and portal to disseminate information on all European Union (EU) funded research projects and their results in the broadest sense.

The website and repository include all public information held by the Commission (project fact-sheets, publishable reports, links to publications and deliverables), editorial content to support dissemination and exploitation, and comprehensive links to external sources such as open access publications and websites.

Advisory services on conducting research using CORDIS is available at European Documentation Centres across the EU.

Services and activities
CORDIS offers access to a broad range of information and services on EU research, including:
The primary repository of EU-funded research projects and their results, including the formal deliverables collected by the European Commission
Multilingual "Results in brief" that summarise the outcomes of research projects for a broader public and to support the exploitation of results
Daily news,
Result packs: collections of up-to-date articles focussed on a specific theme for specialised audiences; they are available online and as print brochures 
Search and reuse facilities, including custom email alerts, RSS feeds and XML extractions

The CORDIS website is available in six languages (English, French, German, Italian, Spanish and Polish), although much of the scientific content is only in English.

CORDIS content dates back to the origin of the service in 1990 and the website has been online since 1994, as the first website of the European institutions.

Organisation and legal basis

CORDIS is managed by the Publications Office of the European Union, on behalf of the European Commission's research Directorates-General and Agencies.

CORDIS was created in 1990 following a Communication of the Commission for the implementation of an RTD information service (SEC(1988)1831).

The legal basis and financing of CORDIS derive from the work programmes of Horizon Europe Framework Programme for Research and Innovation.

Creation
The creation of CORDIS was a DG XIII initiative - the Commission decision SEC(88)1831 allowed the service to be first established in 1988. In 1989 the launch of the VALUE Programme provided a convenient vehicle to carry the development of the budding CORDIS  service.

The first three databases were established and first published on the ESPRIT Day in November 1990. Users could review R&D Programmes, R&D Projects and R&D Publications using the Common Command Language (CCL) on the ECHO (European Commission Host Organisation) server. This meant that only trained experts could use the service, but nevertheless some 500 user sessions were registered during the first month.

History

Early 90s

By the end of the first year in late 1991 three new databases had been added (R&D Acronyms, R&D Results and R&D-related COMdocuments). These six databases could be accessed via a "videotex"-style menu.

The total number of database records had swelled to around 70 000. Some 800 people had registered as CORDIS users and up to 1,000 user sessions were taking place each month. However, CORDIS was still a specialist tool used mainly by librarians and a few other experts who could use the service.

In April 1992, the Council decision for more centralised action under the VALUE2 Programme confirmed the need for CORDIS and gave a boost to its development. The development of a Common Production System (CPS) was initiated to facilitate quality management of all information.

In 1993, three more databases were added (R&D Contacts, R&D Partners and R&D News). The first full release of the CPS was completed, and a CD-ROM of all nine databases was made available. By this time the combined databases contained some 90,000 records, The number of registered users had more than doubled at 2,000 and some 6,000 user sessions per month were being experienced.

1994-1996

1994 was an important year for CORDIS. The launch of the 4th R&D Framework Programme (1994-1998), and within it the Innovation Programme, gave a further explicit mandate to CORDIS.

Strong interest prompted the addition of German and French to the R&D News database, marking the first language addition to an English language environment. Migration onto a new open systems architecture (UNIX-like system, FULCRUM databases, Web and FTP servers) facilitated the introduction of a number of new features - a WWW service, and a user-friendly Windows interface, WatchCORDIS. These measures boosted the system's attractiveness to users. By the end of the year, CORDIS offered some 130 000 database records which encouraged 11 000 registered users to perform nearly 15 000 user sessions per month.

1995-96 was a period of further consolidation and development. The CORDIS databases and web services were fully integrated as the migration into the new Information Dissemination environment (IDS) was completed. On-line host access was integrated into Watch-CORDIS and added to the CD-ROM service, allowing users to work both on-line and off-line coherently. The R&D News service was enriched by adding Italian and Spanish, bringing the offer to five languages. The CORDIS-Focus publication was launched, providing readers with a paper edition of key R&D News articles in three languages - EN, FR & DE.

The first move to cover national R&D information was initiated by Ireland with the start of the EU presidency service. By the end of 1996, CORDIS had 24,000 registered users eager to browse through 152 000 database records and accessing the web pages some 300,000 times per month. A period of rapid growth in numbers of users had been initiated by the move onto the WWW.

Late 90s

In 1997, Italian and Spanish editions brought the CORDIS focus offer up to five languages. Ireland was succeeded by The Netherlands and Luxembourg as Presidency countries and both published their presidency services on CORDIS. A new information monitoring service was launched - 'RAPIDUS - RAPId Delivery of Updates on Search-profiles'.

A pilot project was launched to offer CORDIS as a host for national and regional web services. By the end of the year, user registration no longer seemed so relevant as some 53,000 identified users accessed over 800,000 Web pages per month and downloaded nearly 40,000 documents. It had become clear that CORDIS was no longer a tool reserved for specialists, the spectacular growth in use initiated in 1996 had continued.

In 1998–99, the development of CORDIS continued at a brisk pace. A tenth database was added - the R&D Document Library. The four successive EU presidency countries - UK, Austria, Germany and Finland - published their EU presidency services on CORDIS.

The new fifth R&D Framework Programme was officially launched in February 1999 and confirmed the role of CORDIS as the principal and official common information service for all EU R&D activities.

The Innovation/SMEs programme confirmed the financing of the CORDIS service and also enlarged its scope to cover innovation activities in general and innovation support services in particular. During 1999 there were 130 000 identified users, 300,000 document downloads and some 2.5 million user visits.

Early 2000s

2000: Portuguese and French Presidencies, PAXIS service, redesigned FP5 service, RTD beyond 2002 service
2001: Swedish and Belgium Presidencies, Business incubators service, first Innobarometer report and innovation scoreboard, SME    Techweb and SME/innovation studies, candidate countries service, FP6 launch
2002: Spanish and Danish Presidencies, My CORDIS, CORDIS Express, FP6 & EoI service, official FP6 service and FP6 calls, redesigned CORDIS technology marketplace, CORDIS Wire, Stats: 5 million pages accesses per month, 56 million ‘hits’, 40,000 web pages, 230,000 users per month, 260,000 DB records
2003: Greek and Italian Presidencies, redesigned ERA service, FP6 glossary, new ICA search prototype, Science and Society service, IST Results integration, start of introduction of Integrated CORDIS Architecture
2004: Irish and Dutch Presidencies, new incubators service, redesigned nanotechnology service. IP and NoE guidance service, Technology platforms, 
2005: Luxembourg and UK presidencies, New 34Mbit/s line/ Géant link-up, Polish news service

Status around 2005 
CORDIS's principal aims were stated as:
To facilitate participation in Community research activities.
To improve exploitation of research results, whilst focusing on sectors essential to Europe's competitiveness.
To promote the sharing of know-how in order to boost companies’ innovation capacities, in particular by publishing the results of EU-financed research conducted under successive framework programmes, and the espousal of new technologies by society.

CORDIS offers access to a wide range of information on EU research.

References

External links 
 CORDIS
 

European Union and science and technology
European Union organisations based in Luxembourg
General Services in the European Commission
Information technology organizations based in Europe
Research and development in Europe
Science websites